The Vienna Vikings is an American football club based in Vienna, Austria. Founded in 1983, the Vikings are known as one of Europe's most dominant clubs, having won the Eurobowl title five times (2004–2007 and 2013), as well being the runner-up five times (2001, 2003, 2008, 2010 and 2012). In the national championship the Vikings are holding the record of 15 Austrian Bowl victories. Since the 2022 season they are member of the European League of Football and under the name Dacia Vienna Vikings they are also still part of the Austrian Football League (AFL).

History 
The Vikings were founded in 1983. Three years later, the Vikings made it to the Austrian Bowl, the Austrian championship game, where they fell short against the Graz Giants. In 1994, the Vikings won their first national championship and repeated the victory two years later. In 1999, the Vikings played their eighth Austrian Bowl, all of them against the Giants, and gained their third title. It was also their first of five consecutive Austrian Bowl wins. Until 2007 the Vikings made it always to the Austrian Bowl and collected two more national titles becoming the team with the record number of 10 Austrian Bowl wins. From 2012 to 2017 the Vikings won four more national titles.

From 2014 to 2016, the team took part in a new European competition, the BIG6 European Football League.

Naming rights
1983–1998: Vienna Vikings
1999–2005: Chrysler Vikings
2006–2007: Dodge Vikings Vienna
2008–2014: Raiffeisen Vikings Vienna
2015–2016: Vienna Vikings
2017– Dacia Vienna Vikings

European League of Football

On September 25, 2021 the Vienna Vikings announced their that their first team will compete in the 2022 European League of Football season together with their league rival Tyrolean Raiders The coaching staff of the former AFL team will continue coaching the ELF team. The franchise, now being a private corporation as a GesmbH, is owned by the Voluntary association. Together with its rivals Raiders Tirol the Vikings play in the Central Conference of the ELF. The participation allows the signing of up to 8 European foreign players and 4 US-American, Canadian, Mexican or Japanese players.

At the start of the 2022 season, business lawyer and long-time Austrian Football League quarterback Robin Lumsden joined as co-owner and investor. On February 17, 2022 the organisations announced that all home games in the ELF season will be played at the Generali Arena Vienna.

Roster

Staff

Season-by-season

Honours
 European League of Football 
 Champions: 2022
 Eurobowl
 Champions: (5) 2004–2007, 2013
 Runners-up: (5) 2001, 2003, 2008, 2010, 2012
 Austrian Bowl
 Champions: (15) 1994, 1996, 1999–2003, 2005, 2007, 2009, 2012–2014, 2017, 2020
 Runners-up: (13) 1986, 1988, 1991, 1995, 1998, 2004, 2006, 2011, 2015, 2018, 2019, 2021, 2022

References

External links

Official website 

American football teams in Austria
American football teams established in 1983
1983 establishments in Austria
Viking Age in popular culture
Sport in Vienna
European League of Football teams
Vienna Vikings